Hoseynabad (also Romanized as Ḩoseynābād; also known as Husainābād) is a village in Rostaq Rural District, in the Central District of Saduq County, Yazd Province, Iran. At the 2006 census, its population was 81, in 27 families.

References 

Populated places in Saduq County